Harold S. Grant (January 16, 1900 – December 31, 1997) was an American football coach.  He was the fifth head football coach at the College of Emporia in Emporia, Kansas. His teams accumulated a record of 34–4–1.  His teams won the Kansas Collegiate Athletic Conference championship in 1925 and shared the title in 1927 with cross-town rival Kansas State Teachers.

Grant later resided in Redondo Beach, California.

Head coaching record

References

External links
 

1900 births
1997 deaths
College of Emporia Fighting Presbies football coaches
College of Emporia Fighting Presbies football players
Missouri S&T Miners football coaches
People from Emporia, Kansas
Players of American football from Kansas